Fissurella afra is a species of sea snail, a marine gastropod mollusk in the family Fissurellidae, the keyhole limpets.

Description
Fissurella afra has on ovate-oblong and convex shell. The bull-fish within it is painted with brownish-violet rays and is white within. For the rest it is ovate, conicale, and obtuse at its summit; its fissure is ovate and contracted in the middle. Fissurella afra is also very finely striated radiately, and marked in the same way with radiating bands of a violaceous-brown on a yellowish-white ground.
This species is often confused with the D. nimbosa, but its summit is more elevated and the aperture is carried more forward.

Length 9, breath 7, alt. 5 ½ lines.

Distribution

This particular species of mollusc is native to the Islands of the Archipelago or Capo Verde, in particular that of St. Iago.

References

Fissurellidae
Gastropods described in 1834